The Vizhinjam International Deepwater Multipurpose Seaport, also known as the Vizhinjam Port is an under-construction port on the Arabian Sea coast at city of Trivandrum . Developed in three phases, the first phase is expected to get completed by September 2023. The initial date of completion was expected to be between December 2019 and August 2020. However, due to some problems in land acquisition and also due the impact of COVID-19, it resulted in delays, and is now expected to be completed by 2023.

It is proposed to follow the landlord port model, with the intention of catering for passenger, container and other cargo shipping. Vizhinjam International Seaport Limited (VISL) is a special purpose government company fully owned by Government of Kerala that would act as an implementing agency for the development of this greenfield port.

Vizhinjam is a natural port near the international ship route. It will also affect existing cargo movement to other ports and will cater to transhipment. Vizhinjam port will co-exist and compete with international ports including ports of Colombo, Singapore and Dubai.

History
The idea for a port at Vizhinjam was first mooted by Travancore Diwan Ramaswami Ayyar. However the present under-construction port was originally conceived about 25 years ago.

The initial project model was suggested as a Public Private Partnership (PPP)- Private Services model. Two rounds of bidding and tenders called under the PPP model failed because of the inherent nonviability of the project's economic rationale. The first round was granted to a Chinese company that failed to get security clearance from the Centre. The second round was first awarded to Lanco Group and was then challenged in the Kerala High Court by Zoom Developers, which led to the eventual withdrawal of Lanco Group. The Kerala cabinet on 10 June 2015 decided to award the project to Adani Ports and SEZ, the sole bidder.

The International Finance Corporation (IFC) is currently the transaction advisor to Vizhinjam International Seaport Limited (VISL). The IFC was appointed in November 2009 as the lead advisor to the port. The IFC undertook in 2009 - 2010 a series of studies and reports that recommended the state to undertake the project under the landlord model, under which the state would invest over US$1 billion to build the port, rather than the PPP model, under which the Private Partner would bear the cost of the port. Larsen & Toubro Infrastructure Engineering had undertaken the environmental impact assessment study of the container port.

After the landlord model was accepted by the state government, a bidding round concluded. A consortium led by Welspun was the sole eligible company for the port operator role. In negotiations between the state government and the Welspun Group, Welspun agreed to reduce the grant to 400 Crores. Kerala State Government rejected this offer because the terms of the PPP saw no economic rationale for the State Government.

An Expert Appraisal Committee of the Ministry of Environment recommended clearance for the project on 3 December 2013. Tenders for construction of a breakwater, fish landing center, and port operator began the next day.

The Adani group emerged as the sole bidder for the project and the project was awarded to Adani Vizhinjam Port Private Ltd. in 2015. At the time of awarding the project, it was expected to completed in 1000 days.

Features 
The port is supposed to be 150 metres in width. About 2.5 to 2.75 km² (600 to 700 acres) would be made available through reclamation of the sea. The port would have two breakwaters of 1.5 km and 6 km with harbour basin and wharfs. There would be about 30 berths, most of which would be capable of handling mother ships. 

The port will have an in-port rapid transit metro system that will connect passengers within the passenger terminal of the port. It will be connected through a new bypass that starts from Thiruvananthapuram and will pass through Thiruvallam and Kovalam.

Protests by locals 
The local fishing communities had been protesting against the port allegedly abusing their human rights which intensified in August 2022. The biggest demand of the protesters is that the construction of the Rs 7,525-crore deepwater port and container transhipment terminal at Vizhinjam on the outskirts of Thiruvananthapuram should be stopped and a proper environmental impact study should be carried out. The community has also put forward six other demands: (i) rehabilitation of families who lost their homes to sea erosion, (ii) effective steps to mitigate coastal erosion, (iii) financial assistance to fisherfolk on days weather warnings are issued, (iv) compensation to families of those who lose their lives in fishing accidents, (v) subsidised kerosene, and (vi) a mechanism to dredge the Muthalappozhi fishing harbour in Anchuthengu in Thiruvananthapuram district. The locals claim that more than 100 families lost their homes to coastal erosion last year, but there is no official data on the relocated families except for some church records. Around 300 families were living in schools and camps, and many others were staying in rented accommodation or with relatives. The Latin Catholic church has been in the forefront of the protest. The Hindu Dheevara community as well as several environmental activists and scientists are supporting the protest.

On 27 November 2022 night, some protesters attacked Vizhinjam police station, leaving over 30 policemen on-duty injured. Attackers were demanding the release of five protesters who had been detained the previous day. 

On 6 December 2022, the protests were called-off after a series of talks held between the protesters and the government.

Environmental issues 
One of the main concerns around the project is its impact on the coastline as the Thiruvananthapuram District is considered high erosion through a study conducted by Ministry of Earth Sciences. Particularly, the breakwater presents an issue in displacing erosion away from its natural patterns. As the breakwater pushes water away from the area around the port, strong currents will be pushed to the area on either side- areas where around 16,00,000 fishers rely on for their earnings. Besides impacts on fishing, the erosion of coastline represents potential risk to coast structural integrity and multiple natural systems.

Since Wadge Bank is one of the primary fishing grounds in Southern India, the port construction will negatively impact the breeding ground of over 2000 varieties of fish and the largest coral reef of the Indian Ocean. Over 5,00,000 fishermen have access to great knowledge of the local area and sea, the continuation of construction will deprive families of their livelihood, and consequently, the government will be deprived of ecological insight.

Legal disputes
The state of Kerala and the Gujarat-based Adani group have been embroiled in a legal dispute over the delay in completion of the project. The project was delayed after the private partner - Adani repeatedly kept on invoking the force majeure clause to explain the delay in completing the project. Currently, the parties have agreed to enter into an arbitration to resolve the dispute.

References

Further reading

External links
Trivandrum Investment and Business Zone - TRIBIZ
Vizhinjam Port Official Web Site.

Ports and harbours of Kerala
Proposed ports in India
Transport in Thiruvananthapuram
Companies based in Thiruvananthapuram